Phosphoribosyl pyrophosphate synthetase-associated protein 1 is an enzyme that in humans is encoded by the PRPSAP1 gene.

References

Further reading